Simon Mills may refer to:

 Simon Mills (producer), television producer
 Simon Mills (footballer) (born 1964), English former footballer
 Simon Mills, musician known for solo work as Napoleon, and member of electronica duo Bent